Danguillaume is a surname. Notable people with the surname include:

Camille Danguillaume (1919–1950),  French cyclist
Jean-Pierre Danguillaume (born 1946), French cyclist

French-language surnames